Digital China is a company listed on the main board of The Stock Exchange of Hong Kong in 2001 following a successful spin off from the Legend Group.

History 
Digital China was created from Legend Holdings which became Lenovo in 2001.
In pursuit of its "Digitalized China" corporate strategy, Digital China is focused on providing electronic business platforms, solutions and services. A one-stop IT services concept, allows it to span across a range of different industries, from banking and telecommunications to government and public sectors. Leveraging on its partnership with over 100 top IT vendors worldwide, Digital China has become the largest integrated IT service provider in China.

See also 
Legend Holdings
Lenovo

References

External links
 Digital China

Companies listed on the Hong Kong Stock Exchange
Online companies of China
Hong Kong brands